Contraption may refer to:
 a contraption; a machine, device or gadget
 Contraption, a television game show formerly broadcast on the Disney Channel
 Circus Contraption, a one-ring circus, vaudeville and dark cabaret troupe based in Seattle, Washington